Kim Jin-ho (born May 21, 1986) is a South Korean singer. He is a member of the band SG Wannabe. He released his first solo album, Today on February 14, 2013. His first solo concert tour on March 27 to 28, 2013, in support of his first studio album Today (2013).

Personal life 
On July 29, 2022, it was confirmed that Kim will get married with a non-celebrity, who is younger than him, on October 23.

Discography

Studio albums

Extended plays

Singles

References

External links

1986 births
Living people
MBK Entertainment artists
South Korean pop singers
South Korean contemporary R&B singers
South Korean television personalities
Kyung Hee University alumni
21st-century South Korean  male singers
South Korean male singer-songwriters